Hornerstown is an unincorporated community located within Upper Freehold Township in Monmouth County, New Jersey, United States. Hornerstown is located near Cream Ridge and uses the 08514 ZIP code.

Centered about the intersection of Hornerstown-Arneystown Road and Main Street (both separate branches of Monmouth County Route 27), the area is mostly made up of houses with horse farms west of the community. Small businesses line nearby highways CR 537 and CR 539. The town formerly had a stop on the Pemberton and Hightstown Railroad. The former railroad right-of-way has been developed into the Union Transportation Trail.

References

Upper Freehold Township, New Jersey
Unincorporated communities in Monmouth County, New Jersey
Unincorporated communities in New Jersey